The 2009–10 Cornell Big Red women's ice hockey team represented Cornell University in the 2009–10 NCAA Division I women's hockey season. The Big Red were coached by Doug Derraugh and assisted by Dani Bilodeau and Edith Zimmering.  The Big Red were a member of the Eastern College Athletic Conference and were one of the most improved teams in the NCAA. The Big Red won 21 games, an improvement of nine wins over the 2008-09 season. The Big Red finished second in the USA Today poll and were 21-9-6 overall. The team won both the regular season ECAC title with a 14-2-6 record as well as the Ivy League title. Cornell won the league's post-season tournament, defeating Clarkson 4-3 in overtime in the championship game. The team qualified for the NCAA tournament and advanced to the championship game before losing to Minnesota-Duluth 3-2 in the third overtime period. Coach Derraugh was named the AHCA Division 1 Coach of the Year.

Offseason
 August 17: A trio of Big Red players were selected to the Canadian U22 National Team. Sophomore Catherine White and incoming freshmen Lauriane Rougeau and Laura Fortino were selected among the 23-player roster. Chelsea Karpenko participated at the camp but was not named to the team.
 Sept. 4: Rebecca Johnston has scored five goals in two games, including her first career hat trick, in the 2009 Canada Cup.

Exhibition

Regular season
 Oct 31: The Cornell women's hockey team defeated its second straight ranked opponent with a 4-3 victory over #9 Harvard on Saturday afternoon. The win gives the Big Red its first ever weekend sweep against Dartmouth and Harvard after Cornell's 3-0 win against Dartmouth.
 February 17: Laura Fortino, Lauriane Rougeau and Catherine White are among 45 nominees for the Patty Kazmaier Memorial Award.
 March 4: Catherine White has been named a finalist for the ECAC Player of the Year Award.
 March 6: ECAC Hockey announced that Catherine White has been awarded the Player of the Year award. White led the ECAC in assists with 24.

Standings

Roster

Schedule
(nc) stands for non-conference
Home Games in BOLD

Player stats

Skaters

Goaltenders

Postseason
 March 7: Sophomore Kendice Ogilvie beat Clarkson goaltender Lauren Dahm at 7:52 mark in overtime. With the victory, Cornell wins its first ECAC tournament, and earns its first trip to the NCAA Frozen Four.

NCAA tournament
 On March 13, 2010, Cornell defeated the Harvard Crimson women's ice hockey program by a score of 6-2 to earn its first ever trip to the NCAA Frozen Four.
 March 21: Cornell goaltender Amanda Mazzotta set a record for most saves in an NCAA Championship game with 61 saves. The former record holder was Bulldog goaltender Patricia Sautter who had 41 saves in 2003.

Awards and honors
 Doug Derragh, Division I Coach of the Year
 Laura Fortino, 2010 ECAC All-Rookie Team
 Amanda Mazzotta, ECAC Defensive Player of the Week (Week of November 2)
 Kendice Ogilvie, ECAC tournament Most Outstanding Player
 Lauriane Rougeau, 2010 ECAC All-Rookie Team
 Catherine White, Pre-Season All-ECAC Team
 Catherine White, ECAC Player of the Year
 Liz Zorn, finalist for the 2009-10 ECAC Women’s Best Defensive Forward Award

All-America selections
 Laura Fortino, 2010 Women's RBK Hockey Division I All-America First Team
 Lauriane Rougeau, 2010 Women's RBK Hockey Division I All-America Second Team
 Catherine White, 2010 Women's RBK Hockey Division I All-America Second Team

Ivy League honors
 Laura Fortino, Defense, Freshman, 2010 First Team All-Ivy
 Chelsea Karpenko, Forward, Sophomore, 2010 Second Team All-Ivy
 Amanda Mazzotta, Goaltender, Sophomore, 2010 First Team All-Ivy
 Lauriane Rougeau, Defense, Freshman, 2010 First Team All-Ivy
 Lauriane Rougeau, 2010 Ivy League Rookie of the Year
 Catherine White, Forward, Sophomore, 2010 First Team All-Ivy
 Catherine White, 2010 Ivy League Player of the Year

See also
 2009–10 College Hockey America women's ice hockey season
 2009–10 Eastern College Athletic Conference women's ice hockey season

References

External links
 Cornell Official site
 Cornell ECAC hockey site

Cornell
NCAA women's ice hockey Frozen Four seasons
Cornell Big Red women's ice hockey seasons
Cornell
Cornell